Admiral Golovko is a  of the Russian Navy. She is the first ship in the class to be equipped with domestic powerplant, rather than imported from Ukraine.

Design
Unlike their Soviet-era predecessors, the new ships are designed for multiple roles. They are to be capable to execute long-range strikes, conduct anti-submarine warfare and to carry out escort missions.

Construction and career 
Admiral Golovko was laid down on 1 February 2012, and launched on 22 May 2020 by Severnaya Verf in Saint Petersburg. She is scheduled to be commissioned in 2022.

It was reported that Admiral Golovko would be the first Russian surface ship to be armed with Tsirkon hypersonic missiles, but the Russian frigate Admiral Gorshkov and first of the class was the first ship armed with Tsirkon hypersonic missiles. She was expected to be deployed with the Northern Fleet once commissioned.

On 26 November 2022, Admiral Golovko went to sea for the first time and started factory sea trials.

References 

2020 ships
Ships built at Severnaya Verf
Admiral Gorshkov-class frigates